Maria João Koehler and Katalin Marosi were the defending champions, having won the previous event in 2011, but neither player chose to participate.

Andrea Gámiz and Aymet Uzcátegui won the title, defeating Elena Bogdan and Alexandra Cadanțu in the final, 6–3, 6–4.

Seeds

Draw

Draw

References
Main Draw

Zagreb Ladies Open - Doubles
Zagreb Ladies Open